This is a list of Primetime Emmy Awards ceremonies, the years which they were honoring, their hosts, and their ceremony dates.

List of ceremonies

Multiple ceremonies hosted 

The following individuals have hosted (or co-hosted) the Emmy Awards ceremony on two or more occasions.

Notes

References

External links
 Academy of Television Arts and Sciences 57 years of Emmy List of Emmy Awards ceremonies and highlights
 Emmy Awards on IMDb.com
 Washington Post's article on Emmy hosts

 
Ceremonies
Primetime Emmy Awards
Emmy